

Men's events

Women's events

Open events

References

 

Events at the 2003 Pan American Games
Sailing at the Pan American Games
2003 in sailing
Sailing competitions in the Dominican Republic